The Jordão River (Portuguese, Rio Jordão) is a river of Paraná state in southern Brazil. It is a tributary of the Iguazu River.

See also
 List of rivers of Paraná
 Tributaries of the Río de la Plata

References

Brazilian Ministry of Transport

Rivers of Paraná (state)